Crazy House is a 1943 comedy film starring Ole Olsen and Chic Johnson. 

Crazy House is notable for its impressive cast of supporting comedians (Percy Kilbride, Cass Daley, Shemp Howard, Edgar Kennedy, Franklin Pangborn, Billy Gilbert, Richard Lane, Andrew Tombes, Chester Clute, and Hans Conried) and guest stars under contract to Universal at the time (Allan Jones, Basil Rathbone and Nigel Bruce, Robert Paige, Leo Carrillo, Johnny Mack Brown, and Andy Devine).

Plot
Two Broadway stars return to Universal Studios to make another movie. The mere mention of Olsen and Johnson's names evacuates the studio and terrorizes the management and personnel. Undaunted, the comedians hire an assistant director and unknown talent, and set out to make their own movie. Financed by an eccentric "angel", the completed feature is set to premiere when angry creditors confiscate most of the film. Olsen and Johnson keep the preview going, anyway, and their venture is a success.

Cast 

Ole Olsen as himself 
Chic Johnson as himself 
Cass Daley as herself and her stand-in, Sadie Silverfish 
Martha O'Driscoll as Marjorie Nelson, alias Marjorie Wyndingham 
Patric Knowles as Edmund "Mac" MacLean 
Percy Kilbride as Col. Cornelius Merriweather 
Hans Conried as Roco, set designer
Leighton Noble as himself, bandleader
Richard Lane as Hanley, production broker 
Thomas Gomez as N. G. Wagstaff, Universal executive
Billy Gilbert as Sid Drake, offering camera rentals 
Edgar Kennedy as Judge 
Andrew Tombes as Horace L. Gregory, offering laboratory services 
Chester Clute as Mr. Fud, offering costume rentals
Franklin Pangborn as hotel clerk 
Shemp Howard as Mumbo 
Fred Sanborn as Jumbo
Joseph Crehan as Wagstaff's doctor
Count Basie Orchestra with Jimmy Rushing and Thelma Carpenter
The Delta Rhythm Boys
Ray Walker as radio host at drive-in
 James Dime as dead end character

Cameo appearances by Allan Jones, Leo Carrillo, Andy Devine, Basil Rathbone, Nigel Bruce, Johnny Mack Brown, Robert Paige, Ramsay Ames

Reception
Crazy House was the first of three Olsen & Johnson vehicles following up the success of their 1941 film Hellzapoppin'. The team's wild style of comedy had always been a matter of taste, more for "plain folks" than sophisticates, and contemporary exhibitor reports ran the gamut: "Just made for small towns. Some people said it was the best picture we had shown in months." (F. R. Crist, Crist Theatre, Loveland, Ohio.) "These boys are not appreciated here. However, it was played to average business and drew many laughs from those who came in." (C. A. Smith, Regent Theatre, Chapleau, Ontario.) "This picture is just what the name implies. We did below average business and I received no favorable comments from my patrons." (Charles A. Brooks, Ritz Theatre, Marshfield, Missouri.) "This is the first Olsen and Johnson I've ever played and it's the last. This feature is terrible." (O. E. Simon, Roxy Theatre, Menno, South Dakota.)

The film did well in first-run engagements, grossing more than one million dollars. However, the high budget cut into the profit margin, so Universal economized on Olsen & Johnson's next two features, Ghost Catchers and See My Lawyer.

References

External links 
 
 
 

1943 films
American black-and-white films
Films directed by Edward F. Cline
1943 comedy films
Universal Pictures films
American comedy films
Self-reflexive films
1940s English-language films
1940s American films